Francisco de Velasco, 5th Marquis of Berlanga, (in full), (c.1637 - c.1690), was a Spanish nobleman.

History 
Tovar was the second son of Bernardino Fernández de Velasco, 6th Duke of Frías and of Isabel María de Guzmán. He married María Catalina de Carvajal Cobos Mendoza y Manrique, 4th Marchioness of Jódar, with whom he had 5 children.

José Fernández de Velasco, 8th Duke of Frías
Manuel de Velasco
Isabel de Velasco y Carvajal
María Victoria de Velasco y Tovar
Manuela de Velasco

Sources

1637 births
1690 deaths
05
Francisco
Knights of Santiago